Alliss is a surname. Notable people with the surname include:

Percy Alliss (1897–1975), English golfer
Peter Alliss (1931–2020), English golfer, son of Percy
Peter Alliss Masters, children's charity founded by Peter Alliss

See also 
ALLISS, a type of shortwave radio antennae
 Allis (disambiguation)
 Alis (disambiguation)
 Alice (disambiguation)